Hajj Siran (also Romanized as Ḩājj Sīrān; also known as Gol Sīrān, Ḩājjī Sīrān, Hajeiseran, Ḩājjsīrān, and Khadzheseyran) is a village in Qareh Poshtelu-e Pain Rural District of Qareh Poshtelu District of Zanjan County, Zanjan province, Iran. At the 2006 National Census, its population was 383 in 83 households. The following census in 2011 counted 318 people in 87 households. The latest census in 2016 showed a population of 321 people in 106 households; it was the largest village in its rural district.

References 

Zanjan County

Populated places in Zanjan Province

Populated places in Zanjan County